Nir Nakav is an Israeli drummer. He is the head of the drums department in Rimon School of Jazz and Contemporary Music in Israel.
Since 1998 he is the drummer of the extreme metal band Salem. Nakav is a graduate of Musicians Institute (MI) college in Hollywood, California.
Nakav authored an educational textbook for drummers, titled "Battle Hymns".

References

External links
 Nir Nakav's Homepage
 Salem band Homepage
 "Foreplay"
 "Gevald Brothers"

Living people
Heavy metal drummers
Rock drummers
1972 births